Les oiseaux du bonheur (meaning The Birds of Happiness) is the second French-language compilation album by Canadian singer Celine Dion, released in France in 1984. It is also her second album released in France. It includes mainly songs from Mélanie, which was released in Quebec, Canada in 1984.

Content
Les oiseaux du bonheur is a compilation of songs from Dion's previous Canadian albums. It was promoted by the "Mon rêve de toujours" single.

The album includes mainly songs from Mélanie, plus three new tracks: "Paul et Virginie", "Les oiseaux du bonheur" and "Hymne à l'amitié". It also includes a new (third) recording of "La voix du bon Dieu".

"Paul et Virginie" (renamed "Virginie... Roman d'amour") and "Les oiseaux du bonheur" could be found on Dion's next Canadian album C'est pour toi. However, "Hymne à l'amitié" was never released in Canada.

Track listing
All tracks produced by Eddy Marnay and Rudi Pascal.

Release history

References

External links

1984 compilation albums
Albums produced by Eddy Marnay
Celine Dion compilation albums